Aulexis is a genus of leaf beetles in the subfamily Eumolpinae. It is distributed in East and Southeast Asia. The related genus Goniopleura is sometimes included as a subgenus.

Species

 Aulexis abbreviata (Gressitt, 1942)
 Aulexis assamensis Jacoby, 1903
 Aulexis atripennis Pic, 1923
 Aulexis bicolor Pic, 1929
 Aulexis bicoloripes Pic, 1929
 Aulexis bosi Medvedev, 2008
 Aulexis brevicornis Weise, 1922
 Aulexis brevidentata (Gressitt, 1942)
 Aulexis brevipennis Medvedev, 2012
 Aulexis brevipilosa Medvedev, 2002
 Aulexis buonloicus Eroshkina, 1988
 Aulexis carinata Pic, 1935
 Aulexis chengana Chen, 1940
 Aulexis cinnamomi Chen & Wang, 1976
 Aulexis elongata Jacoby, 1881
 Aulexis erythodera Warchałowski, 2008
 Aulexis excavata Takizawa, 2017
 Aulexis femoralis Medvedev, 2012
 Aulexis flavopilosa Lefèvre, 1885
 Aulexis gorbunovi Medvedev, 2009
 Aulexis gracilicornis Weise, 1922
 Aulexis gracilicornis Gressitt & Kimoto, 1961 (homonym?)
 Aulexis hochii Chen, 1940
 Aulexis humilis Lefèvre, 1885
 Aulexis jiangkouensis Tan, 1993
 Aulexis kinabaluensis Takizawa, 2017
 Aulexis languei Lefèvre, 1893
 Aulexis longicornis Jacoby, 1899
 Aulexis luzonica Lefèvre, 1885
 Aulexis medvedevi Eroshkina, 1988
 Aulexis minor Kimoto & Gressitt, 1982
 Aulexis minuta Pic, 1935
 Aulexis nepalensis Medvedev & Sprecher-Uebersax, 1997
 Aulexis nigricollis Baly, 1863
 Aulexis nigripennis Jacoby, 1908
 Aulexis nigripennis Kimoto & Gressitt, 1982 (homonym?)
 Aulexis obscura Gressitt, 1945
 Aulexis obscura Takizawa, 2017 (homonym?)
 Aulexis pallida Lefèvre, 1887
 Aulexis philippinensis Jacoby, 1895
 Aulexis puberula Lefèvre, 1885
 Aulexis pusilla Lefèvre, 1885
 Aulexis semiobscurus Pic, 1921
 Aulexis shaowuensis Gressitt & Kimoto, 1961
 Aulexis sichuanensis Tan, 1992
 Aulexis sinensis Chen, 1934
 Aulexis sumatrana Jacoby, 1896
 Aulexis tibialis Jacoby, 1889
 Aulexis tuberculata Tan, 1993
 Aulexis unicolor (Gressitt, 1942)
 Aulexis unispinosa Pic, 1935
 Aulexis varians Baly, 1867
 Aulexis ventralis (Gressitt, 1942)
 Aulexis vietnamicus Eroshkina, 1988
 Aulexis wallacei Baly, 1867

References

Eumolpinae
Chrysomelidae genera
Beetles of Asia
Taxa named by Joseph Sugar Baly